William Carnegie may refer to:
 William Carnegie, 7th Earl of Northesk (1756–1831), English admiral
 William Carnegie, 8th Earl of Northesk (1794–1878), son of the above
 William Hartley Carnegie (1860–1936), Anglican priest and author
 William Carnegie, leader of the Green Party of Alberta